General elections were held in Japan on 18 February 1990 to elect the 512 members of the House of Representatives, the lower house of the National Diet.

Background 
As with the previous House of Councillors election, the "four-point set of evils" in the minds of voters were the controversial consumption tax, the Recruit scandal, agricultural import liberalisation, and former Prime Minister Sōsuke Uno's sex scandal. Political commentators excitedly speculated whether a "Great Reversal" would finally come about in which the LDP loses its majority in the House of Representatives, as the prior 1989 election saw the LDP lose its long-held majority in the House of Councillors.

Results

By prefecture

Analysis 
Although the LDP lost a net total of 25 seats, it still held onto its majority in the House of Representatives with a margin of 19 seats. This was due to the inequitable districting practices in Japan at the time, as individual voters in rural districts tend to both favour the LDP and also be disproportionately influential. However, the LDP did see losses among rural voters in the 1989 elections, and as a result the party pivoted away from their commitment to liberal import policies and back into a more protectionist rhetoric, declaring that "not one grain of foreign rice will be imported into Japan." The LDP also acquiesced by revising the consumption tax law to allow for exceptions; moreover, public resistance to the new tax had slightly decreased since the 1989 Upper House election. Although party leadership tends to have only minor influence on Japanese elections, positive cabinet approval ratings for the LDP bounced back from Noboru Takeshita's low of 10% to the reform-minded Toshiki Kaifu's 33%. In addition, the LDP also made sure to field an ample amount of candidates and to informally support independents, who increased by 12 in this election.

The clear winner in the elections was the Japan Socialist Party, whose number of seats rose by 51 and whose popular vote rose by 7.12% from the last election. This was the JSP's strongest performance in a general election since 1967, and left it as the only party to gain any seats. Meanwhile, the other three main opposition parties (Komeito, the JCP, and the DSP) lost 11, 10, and 12 seats respectively, and all of them also saw reductions in their popular vote. According to surveys, however, the shift in support for the JSP was more to do with the familiar Japanese tendency to cast protest votes against the LDP rather than expressions of support for all of the opposition's platform. Moreover, the JSP continued to suffer from factional infighting and a relative lack of fund-raising when compared to the LDP, and thus its fortunes would only wind up being in the short-term.

References

Japan
1990 elections in Japan
General elections in Japan
February 1990 events in Asia
Election and referendum articles with incomplete results